Stauroteuthis syrtensis, also known as the glowing sucker octopus or bioluminescent octopus, is a species of small pelagic octopus found at great depths in the north Atlantic Ocean. It is one of a very small number of octopuses to exhibit bioluminescence.

Taxonomy
The cirrate octopuses are deep sea species that have been relatively little studied. Some have been described on the basis of a single, poorly preserved specimen, and this makes deducing their phylogenetic relationships difficult.  Some authorities adopt the traditional view that the genus Stauroteuthis is part of the family Stauroteuthidae that is characterized by the presence of a secondary web. The World Register of Marine Species, however, considers that it should be placed in the family Cirroteuthidae, basing this decision on ribosomal DNA and other evidence, and that Stauroteuthidae is a synonym of this family.

Description
These are joined for two-thirds of their length by two webs, a dorsal complete membrane and a ventral partial one, giving the animal an umbrella-like shape. The number of adhesive suckers ranges from 55 to 65. These suckers vary in size and distance among males and females. However, suckers generally decrease in diameter and distance as they extend down the arm. Female suckers reach a maximum diameter of 6.5 mm at suckers 1 to 3 while male suckers, on the other hand, are relatively larger. Between suckers 8 to 25 there are conspicuous cirri. These are elongate, fleshy tendrils borne on the sides of the oral surface of the arms, the longest being at sucker 20 which can be up to 50 mm in length. The oral cavity and mouth area are pink or purple in color that extends towards the arms and lightens as it reaches the tips. The general texture is gelatinous and the animal is reddish-brown and translucent, with the internal organs being visible through the skin. A vestigial, U-shaped, internal shell supports the fins, the only other hard part of the animal being the two-part beak.

Distribution
It seems to be fairly common off the edge of the continental shelf on the eastern coast of the United States, and has also been observed at similar depths off the British Isles.

Bioluminescence
Stauroteuthis is one of only two genera of octopuses to exhibit bioluminescence. S. syrtensis emits a blue-green light from about 40 modified suckers known as photophores situated in a single row between the pairs of cirri on the underside of each arm. The distance between these decreases towards the ends of the arms with the light becoming fainter. The animal does not emit light continuously, but can do so for a period of five minutes after suitable stimulation. Some of the photophores emit a continuous stream of faint light, while others are much brighter and switch on and off in a cyclical pattern, producing a twinkling effect. The function of the bioluminescence is believed to be for defence, being used by the animal to scare off predators, and also as a lure for the planktonic crustaceans that form its main diet. The light may also be used for sexual signaling, but this is considered to be an unlikely function, as the light is deployed by both sexes and by immature, as well as mature, individuals.

References

Octopuses
Molluscs described in 1879
Molluscs of the Atlantic Ocean
Bioluminescent molluscs
Taxa named by Addison Emery Verrill